Francesco Faraldo (born 14 February 1982 in Aversa) is an Italian judoka. At the 2012 Summer Olympics he competed in the men's 66 kg, but was defeated in the first round.

References

External links
 
 
 
 

Italian male judoka
1982 births
Living people
Olympic judoka of Italy
Judoka at the 2012 Summer Olympics
Mediterranean Games bronze medalists for Italy
Competitors at the 2009 Mediterranean Games
Mediterranean Games medalists in judo
20th-century Italian people
21st-century Italian people